"Real Thing" is a song by English born Australian singer-songwriter Ruel. The song was released on 30 August 2019 as the third  single from his second EP, Free Time.

Music video 
The music video for "Real Thing" was released on 12 September 2019. It stars Ruel as a robot who sees another robot get abused and sacrifices himself to save her.

Critical reception
Tanis Smither from Earmilk says that Ruel seamlessly weaved R&B and pop together and the song "mounts into an impressive urgency".

Credits and personnel
Credits adapted from Tidal.

 Ruel Vincent van Djik – lead artist, songwriting
 Alex Hope – songwriting, guitar
 Mark Landon – producer, songwriting
 Spencer Stewart – additional production
 Kito – additional production
 Sean Kantrowitz – guitar
 Daniel Walsh – guitar
 Nigel Rivers – Bass
 Jordan Rose – Drums
 Matt Curtin – assistant engineer
 Chris Athens – mastering engineer
 Eric J. Dubowsky – mixing engineer

Charts

Certifications

Release history

References

2019 singles
2019 songs
Ruel (singer) songs
Songs written by M-Phazes
Songs written by Ruel (singer)
Songs written by Alex Hope (songwriter)